Indu Sarkar is a 2017 Indian period political thriller film, co-written, co-produced and directed by Madhur Bhandarkar. The story screenplay of the movie is written by Anil Pandey and Madhur Bhandarkar and the dialogues are penned by Sanjay Chhel. Indu Sarkar is produced under the banner of Bhandarkar Entertainment and Mega Bollywood Private Limited. The film is set in the period of the emergency in India, i.e. the 19-month-long period from 1975 to 1977 when there was a state of emergency across the country.
The film stars Kirti Kulhari, Neil Nitin Mukesh, Anupam Kher, Tota Roy Chowdhury, Nitanshi Goel and Supriya Vinod. The music is composed by Anu Malik and Bappi Lahiri. The film was released on 28 July 2017 with few cuts.

Plot 
During the Emergency, Indu's husband, a government employee, plans to use the situation to his advantage and move ahead in his career. However, Indu's sense of morality sets her on a different path.

Cast
 Kirti Kulhari as Indu Sarkar
 Tota Roy Chowdhury as Navin Sarkar
 Neil Nitin Mukesh as Sanjay Gandhi
 Nitanshi Goel as Young Indu
 Supriya Vinod as Indira Gandhi
 Rashmi Jha as Farzana
 Anupam Kher as Nanaji Pradhan
 Sheeba Chaddha as Mekhla Singh
 Manav Vij as Inspector Sodhi
 Abhinav Sharma as Shreedhar
 Ankur Vikal as Shivam, an activist
 Varun Singh Rajput as Nihal
 Zakir Hussain as Inspector Mishra
 Mohan Kapoor as Sahani
 Parvin Dabas as Govardhab Singh, IRS Joint Director, IB
 Jashn Agnihotri as actress part of a song (Yeh Pal)

Production
Indu Sarkar includes a recreated version of Aziz Nazan's popular qawwali, Chadhta Sooraj Dheere Dheere Dhal Jaayega. Rashmi Jha was signed for the role of Farzana, which is inspired by socialite Rukhsana Sultana.

Release
The film was released at around 825 screens across India.

Critical reception
The film garnered mixed reviews from critics. Nitin Bhave of Times of India praised the film for its acting performances and gave the film 3 out of 5 stars. Rajeev Masand of News18 gave 2 stars by saying "This is at Best an Average Movie". Hindustan Times criticised the director's confused narrative by giving 2 stars. Giving 2 stars Indian Express also panned the film by saying "A watered-down, bloodless version of the Emergency".

Controversy
The film generated controversy since the time its trailer got released up until it was shown in the theatres. Indian National Congress supporters heavily criticised the director Bhandarkar's attempt to portray former Prime Minister of India Mrs.Indira Gandhi and her son Sanjay Gandhi in a bad light. However, the director clarified that it was not a biopic on former Prime Minister Indira Gandhi under whose regime the Emergency was declared in the country in 1975. Sanjay Gandhi's alleged daughter Priya Singh Paul approached the Bombay High Court seeking a stay on the film. However, Bombay High Court rejected the plea after Paul failed to present solid evidence of her association with the lineage of Sanjay Gandhi. Just two days before the release Paul moved the Supreme Court seeking a stay on the release of the movie after Bombay High Court dismissed her plea. The Supreme Court also refused to stay the release of the film and quoted it as "The movie is an artistic expression within the parameters of law."

After the release of the film several supporters of the Indian National Congress protested and even tried to stall the screening. Congress workers created ruckus in front of a cinema hall in Indore. Police used canes to disperse those who came to blows.

Box office
The film opened at 8.50 million nett on its first day, as reported by Box office India. The film grossed  47 million net in first weekend.
It was declared a disaster.

Soundtrack

References

External links
 
 
 

2010s Hindi-language films
Indian political films
Films scored by Anu Malik
Films set in the 1970s
Indian films based on actual events
Works about the Emergency (India)
Cultural depictions of Indira Gandhi
Films directed by Madhur Bhandarkar